Kadathur is a panchayat town in Dharmapuri district in the Indian state of Tamil Nadu. It is in the southern region of the district.

Demographics
 India census, It had a population of 11,382. Males constitute 51% of the population and females 49%. Kadathur has an average literacy rate of 66%, higher than the national average of 59.5%: male literacy is 75%, and female literacy is 56%. In Kadathur, 11% of the population is under 6 years of age. It is also one of the main revenue villages of Dharmapuri district.

Transport
Kadathur has good roadway facilities and very frequent bus services available to Dharmapuri, Salem and Harur. Nearest railway stations are Morappur and Bommidi(13 km). Nearest airport is Salem Airport. It has direct bus to Coimbatore and Tirupur. Many bus travel via Kadathur from Salem to Dharmapuri, Pappireddipatty to Bengaluru, Bommidi to Chennai, Dharmapuri to Chennai.

References

Cities and towns in Dharmapuri district